Edwige Marie Abéna Fouda (born 2 February 1973) is a Cameroonian sprinter. She competed in the women's 4 × 100 metres relay at the 1996 Summer Olympics.

References

External links
 

1973 births
Living people
Athletes (track and field) at the 1996 Summer Olympics
Cameroonian female sprinters
Olympic athletes of Cameroon
Place of birth missing (living people)
Olympic female sprinters